The 2011 Havant Borough Council election took place on 5 May 2011 to elect members of Havant Borough Council in Hampshire, England. One third of the council was up for election and the Conservative Party stayed in overall control of the council.

After the election, the composition of the council was:
Conservative 35
Liberal Democrats 2
Labour 1

Background
A total of 42 candidates stood at the election for the 10 seats that were contested. The only non-Conservative councillor whose seat was up for election, Liberal Democrat Ann Buckley in Bedhampton ward, stood down at the election.

Election result
The Conservatives won all 10 seats contested and therefore held 35 of the 38 seats on the council, while the Liberal Democrats dropped to 2 seats and Labour remained on 1 seat. The only change saw Conservative George Smith gained Bedhampton from the Liberal Democrats. The Liberal Democrats saw their share of the vote fall, which was blamed on the party's role in the national coalition government. Overall turnout was just over 42%, down from over 61% at the 2010 council election when it had been held at the same time as the general election.

Ward results

Bedhampton

Cowplain

Emsworth

Hart Plain

Hayling East

Hayling West

Purbrook

St Faiths

Stakes

Waterloo

References

2011 English local elections
Havant Borough Council elections
2010s in Hampshire